Hélio Quaglia Barbosa (25 November 1941 – 1 February 2008) was a Brazilian who served on the country's Superior Court of Justice, Brazil's highest appellate court for non-constitutional issues.
Barbosa died in Sao Paulo, Brazil, at the age of 66, of multiple organ failure on 1 February 2008.

References

1941 births
2008 deaths
20th-century Brazilian judges
Place of birth missing